Antonia Juhasz (born 1970) is an American oil and energy analyst, author, journalist and activist. She has authored three books: The Bush Agenda (2006), The Tyranny of Oil (2008), and Black Tide (2011).

Education
Juhasz earned her undergraduate degree in Public Policy at Brown University. She then earned her M.A. degree in Public Policy from Georgetown University.

Career
Juhasz received grants in 2014-2015 and 2013-2014 from the Max & Anna Levinson Foundation   to support her ongoing work in investigative journalism in the oil and energy sectors with Media Alliance and the Investigative Reporting Program, respectively. Juhasz was a 2012-2013 Investigative Journalism Fellow at the Investigative Reporting Program, a working news room at the Graduate School of Journalism at the University of California, Berkeley. She investigated the role of oil and natural gas in the Afghanistan war.

Juhasz is a contributing writer to Rolling Stone and Harper's magazines, among other outlets.

Juhasz is also a reporter with the Investigative Fund of The Nation Institute.

According to information at her website, Juhasz has taught at the New College of California in the Activism and Social Change Masters Program and as a guest lecturer on U.S. Foreign Policy at the McMaster University Labour Studies Program in a unique educational program with the Canadian Automobile Workers Union.

As project director of the International Forum on Globalization, in 1999 Juhasz worked to inform the public about the World Trade Organization, an effort which helped build activism culminating in the 1999 Seattle WTO protests.

Juhasz worked as a legislative assistant in Washington, DC, for two U.S. members of Congress: John Conyers, Jr. (D-MI) and Elijah E. Cummings (D-MD).

Other positions

 Founder and former Director of the Energy Program at Global Exchange
 National Advisory Board Member, Iraq Veterans Against the War
 Board Member, GI Voice/ Coffee Strong
 Senior Policy Analyst, Foreign Policy in Focus
 Associate Fellow, Institute for Policy Studies
 Fellow, Oil Change International
 Director, International Trade Program, American Lands Alliance

Writing

Books
Juhasz is the author of three books. She wrote The Bush Agenda: Invading the World One Economy at a Time in 2006. The Georgia Straight of Canada said it was "One of the crispest, most insightful books yet to expose the Bush regime."

Juhasz's The Tyranny of Oil: the World's Most Powerful Industry and What We Must Do To Stop It (HarperCollins 2008) received the 2009 San Francisco Library Laureate Award. USA Today wrote, Juhasz "reminds us that those who don't learn the lessons of history are fated to repeat its mistakes." Kirkus Reviews finds it a "timely, blistering critique... white-hot... Explosive fuel for the raging debate on oil prices."

Her 2011 book, Black Tide: the Devastating Impact of the Gulf Oil Spill examined the human impact of the Deepwater Horizon oil spill. It was praised by Ms. magazine, which called it "masterfully reported," and by Mother Jones magazine, which said the writing was "both engaging and informative."

Book chapters
Juhasz wrote the essay, "Oil and Water," for the book, Unfathomable City: A New Orleans Atlas, Rebecca Solnit and Rebecca Snedeker, editors (University of California Press, November 2013).

Juhasz wrote the essay, "Roasted Corn Broth with Chunky Pea Guacamole," in the book, Ingredients for Peace: Cooking with Global Peacemakers, Nobel Peace Prize Laureate Jody Williams and Emily Goose, editors (Lulu.com Publishers, February 2010).

Juhasz wrote Chapter 12 "Global Uprising: The Web of Resistance," in the book, A Game As Old As Empire: The Secret World of Economic Hit Men and the Web of Global Corruption, Steven Hiatt, editor (Berrett-Koehler Publishers, February 2007).

Juhasz wrote the essay, "Global Water Wars," in the book, Paradigm Wars: Indigenous Peoples' Resistance to Globalization, Jerry Mander and Victoria Tauli-Corpuz, editors (Sierra Club Books, 2006).

Juhasz is a contributing author to the book Alternatives to Economic Globalization: A Better World is Possible, Jerry Mander and John Cavanagh, editors (Berrett-Koehler Publishers, October 2004).

Reports 
Juhasz is the lead author and editor of The True Cost of Chevron: An Alternative Annual Report, for which she received a 2010 Project Censored Award.

Journalism

Publications carrying her work have included The New York Times, The Washington Post, the Los Angeles Times, Democracy Now!, NPR, and Cambridge University International Relations Journal. She was the object of a Terry Gross interview about The Tyranny of Oil.

According to her LinkedIn report, other publications in which Juhasz's work has appeared include the International Herald Tribune, Rolling Stone, The Atlantic, Harper's Magazine, The Nation, Miami Herald, CNN.com, San Francisco Chronicle, Petroleum Review magazine, In These Times, Cambridge University Review of International Relations Journal, Roll Call, The Daily Mirror (Zimbabwe), The Star (Johannesburg), Multinational Monitor, Tikkun, LeftTurn, AlterNet, The Huffington Post, and TomPaine.com.

Juhasz regularly provides media commentary. She was featured in the CNBC documentary The Hunt for Black Gold, and has appeared in shows including MSNBC, BBC TV and radio, Kudlow & Company, The Business Hour with Neil P. Cavuto, Hannity & Colmes, C-Span's Book TV and Washington Journal, The Diane Rehm Show, Talk of the Nation, To the Point, Marketplace, Bloomberg Radio News, Air America, and Pacifica radio, among many others.

Activism

Juhasz provided testimony at the Iraq Veterans Against the War—Winter Soldier: Iraq & Afghanistan in Silver Spring, Maryland in March 2008; at the Citizens Hearing on the Legality of U.S. Actions in Iraq in support of Lt. Ehren Watada in Tacoma, Washington, in January 2007; and to the New York Session of the World Tribunal on Iraq in May 2004.

On 26 May 2010, Antonia Juhasz was removed from the Chevron Corporation shareholders' meeting in Houston and then arrested outside the meeting venue.  According to people at the meeting, this happened after Juhasz blasted Chevron's environmental record and then together with a few other activists, for several minutes chanted "Chevron lies". According to Juhasz, she was charged with criminal trespass and disrupting a meeting, and was incarcerated for a twenty-four-hour period.

Project Censored awarded Juhasz Top 25 in 2005 for "Ambitions of Empire: The Radical Reconstruction of Iraq's Economy".  In 2007 Peace Action placed Juhasz on their Women Peacemakers Honor Roll, "For women who have made a unique and lasting contribution to work for peace and justice in the world."

See also 

 Petroleum politics

References

Notes

Bibliography
Books
 The Bush Agenda: Invading the World, One Economy at a Time. (HarperCollins, 2006) 
The Tyranny of Oil: The World's Most Powerful Industry—and What We Must Do to Stop It. (HarperCollins, 2008) 
Black Tide: the Devastating Impact of the Gulf Oil Spill  (Wiley, 2011) 

Articles
 "Investigation: Two Years After the BP Spill, A Hidden Health Crisis Festers," The Nation, May 7, 2012
 "The Deepwater Horizon Spill, Four Years On," Harper's, April 1, 2014
 "Why Oil Drilling in Ecuador is 'Ticking Time Bomb' For Planet," CNN.com, February 28, 2014
 "What’s Wrong with Exxon?" The Advocate Magazine, October/November cover article for The Advocate. Nominated for a GLAAD 2013 Media Award for Outstanding Magazine Article.
 "Big Oil’s Big Lies About Alternatives," Rolling Stone, June 25, 2013
 "Light, Sweet, Crude: A former US ambassador peddles influence in Afghanistan," Harper's Magazine, April 22, 2013
 "Chevron's Refinery, Richmond's Peril," Los Angeles Times, August 14, 2012
 "BP vs. Gulf Coast: It's Not Settled Yet," The Nation, March 6, 2012
 "BP Oil Still Tars the Gulf," April 2012 issue Cover article, The Progressive
 "Afghanistan's Energy War," Antonia Juhasz & Shukria Dellawar, Foreign Policy in Focus, October 5, 2011
 "How far should we let Big Oil go?," The Guardian of London, May 24, 2010
 "Whose Oil Is It, Anyway?," New York Times, March 13, 2007

External links

 
 
 Antonia Juhasz: 'Tyranny of Oil' Is A Grave Threat" - Interview by NPR's Fresh Air with Terry Gross
 Antonia Juhasz: "BP’s Missing Oil Washes Up in St. Mary’s Parish, LA" - video report by Democracy Now!
 Huffington Post blog
 "The True Cost of Chevron: An Alternative Annual Report" (2009-2011)

Living people
American anti-globalization writers
American environmentalists
American women environmentalists
American people of Hungarian descent
Anti-corporate activists
Anti-globalization activists
Brown University alumni
Deepwater Horizon oil spill
Georgetown University alumni
Petroleum politics
HuffPost writers and columnists
American women columnists
Women science writers
21st-century American women writers
1970 births